Askvoll is the administrative centre of Askvoll Municipality in Vestland county, Norway. The village is located on the western coast of the mainland, just north of the mouth of the Dalsfjorden in the Sunnfjord region of the county.

Askvoll village is the site of the municipal administration as well as a primary and secondary school. The local police office, dental care, nursing care, and veterinary care are all located here. The village also features various shops, hotels, banks, and pharmacies. Askvoll Church, built in 1863, is located in the village. Askvoll has been a church site since the Middle Ages.

The village has regular ferry connections to Fure (across the Dalsfjorden), to the island of Atløyna, and to the Værlandet-Bulandet islands.

References

Villages in Vestland
Askvoll